The Georgia national under-21 football team is the national under-21 football team of Georgia and is controlled by the Georgian Football Federation. The team is considered to be the feeder team for the senior Georgian national football team. The team competes in the European Under-21 Football Championship, held every two years. Since the establishment of the Georgian under-21 side, the under-21 side has never reached a final tournament of the UEFA European Under-21 Football Championship.

The current team is for Georgian players aged under 21 at the start of the calendar year in which a two-year European Under-21 Football Championship campaign begins, so some players can remain with the squad until the age of 23. As long as they are eligible, players can play for Georgia at any level, making it possible to play for the U21s, senior side, and again for the U21s. This has been the case for several senior team players like Jano Ananidze and Levan Kakubava.

Although the breakup of the Soviet Union occurred officially on 25 December 1991, the under-21 team continued as Soviet Union until the 1992 UEFA European Under-21 Football Championship. After that, Georgia and the other countries who split from the Soviet Union like Armenia, Azerbaijan, Belarus, Estonia, Latvia, Lithuania, Moldova and Ukraine became separate footballing entities.

Competitive record
*Denotes draws include knockout matches decided on penalty kicks.
Gold background colour indicates that the tournament was won.
Silver background colour indicates second place finish.
Bronze background colour indicates third place finish.
Red border color indicates tournament was held on home soil.

UEFA European U-21 Championship

UEFA European U-21 Championship qualification

Standings

Record

Note: Only competitive matches

Current squad
 The following players were called-up for the friendly matches.
 Match dates: 16 and 21 November 2022
 Opposition:  and 
 Caps and goals correct as of: 27 September 2022, after the match against

Statistics

Top goalscorers
Last updated: 2 November 2012

Notable former players

Akaki Khubutia
Aleksandr Amisulashvili
Alexander Guruli
Alexander Kobakhidze
Davit Devdariani
Dato Kvirkvelia
David Targamadze
George Popkhadze
Giorgi Loria
Giorgi Makaridze
Gogita Gogua
Gulverd Tomashvili
Guram Kashia
Jaba Kankava
Jaba Lipartia
Jano Ananidze
Kakha Kaladze
Levan Kakubava
Levan Kenia
Levan Mchedlidze
Mate Vatsadze
Murtaz Daushvili
Nika Dzalamidze
Nukri Revishvili
Otar Martsvaladze
Roin Kvaskhvadze
Shota Grigalashvili
Solomon Kvirkvelia
Tornike Okriashvili
Ucha Lobjanidze
Valeri Kazaishvili
Vladimir Dvalishvili
Zurab Khizanishvili

Managerial history

 Vladimir Gutsaev (1997–1998)
 Gigla Imnadze (1998–1999)
 Murtaz Khurtsilava (1999–2001)
 Show Kopaleishvili (2001–2003)
 Revaz Arveladze (2003–2004)
 Gocha Tkebuchava (2004–2005)
 Koba Zhorzhikashvili (2005–2006)
 Ralf Minge (2006–2007)
 Petar Segrt (2007–2009)
 Otari Gabelia (2009–2011)
 Soso Chedia (2011–2012)
 Aleksandr Chivadze (2012–2016)
 Giorgi Tsetsadze (2017–2019)

Notes

References

External links
 Team Profile & Squad at UEFA.com

under-21
European national under-21 association football teams